Council of People's Commissars of the Ukrainian SSR or the Radnarkom was the highest governing body of executive power in Ukrainian SSR from January 1919 to 1946. Until 1937 it was also a legislative body as well. The council replaced the Temporary Workers-Peasants Government of Ukraine in January 1919. In 1919 during the advance of the Denikin's Army (Armed Forces of South Russia) the role of the council was suspended and for a short period it was merged with the Central Executive Committee of Ukraine and leadership of the Communist Party (Bolsheviks) of Ukraine forming the All-Ukrainian Revolutionary Committee.

List of governments
 People's Secretariat (Skrypnyk, 1917–1918)
 Insurgent Bureau (underground resistance) / Central Military Revolutionary Committee (1918)
 Provisional Workers-Peasants Government of Ukraine (Pyatakov, 1918–1919)
 First Rakovsky Government (1919)
 All-Ukrainian Revolutionary Committee (1919–1920)
 Second Rakovsky Government (1920–1923)
 Chubar Government (1923–1934)
 Lyubchenko Government (1934–1937)
 Bondarenko–Marchak Government (1937–1938)
 First Korotchenko Government (1938–1939)
 Korniyets Government (1939–1944, government-in-exile during World War II)
 Khrushchev Government (1944–1946)

Return of Bolsheviks to Ukraine

After liberation of Ukraine from Denikin's Army in February 1920 was introduced the new composition of the council.
Composition (Feb. 1920)
 Rakovsky, Narkom of Internal Affairs
 Manuilsky, Narkom of Land Affairs
 Hrynko, Narkom of Enlightenment
 Vladymirov, Narkom of Provision
 Terletsky, Narkom of Justice
 Paderin, Narkom of Social Security
 Kost, Narkom of Health Care
 Chubar, representative of the Higher Council of National Economy of RSFSR

In December 1920 after signing a friendship treaty with the RSFSR the council also included several united ministries with the RSFSR that were guided from Moscow. On July 13, 1923 Rakovsky was replaced with Vlas Chubar and reassigned on a diplomatic mission. In 1920 there was created the Ukrainian Economical council that in 1923 was included into the Council of People's Commissars.

See also
 People's Secretariat
 Central Executive Committee of Ukraine

External links
 Council of People's Commissars of Ukrainian SSR
 Soviet governments in Ukraine
 Handbook on the history of Ukraine
 Ukrainian Economic Council
 List of articles on the Soviet bodies of state government
 Historical overlook on the formation of the Soviet state and Ukrainian Soviet republic
 Historical documents of the Ukrainian Soviet government
 Політика Радянського уряду в Україні у 1919 р. (Policy of the Soviet government in Ukraine in 1919)
 Akshinsky, V. Volorshilov.

Political history of Ukraine
Government of Ukraine
Ukraine
Council of People's Commissars (Ukraine)
1919 in Ukraine